Dixanadu is an album released by Moi dix Mois on March 28, 2007. It contains re-recordings of "Tentation" ("Last Temptation") and "Pessimiste" ("Neo Pessimist"), originally from the album Dix Infernal.

Style
The album features Gothic metal combined with traditional Japanese elements of song. The guitar riffs have been compared to those of Slayer. Another element are twin guitars with a tone shift of a fourth.

Reception
The German Sonic Seducer magazine called the album a milestone of J-Rock and the dark culture in general. The reviewer noted also that the melody lines were more international than on the band's previous releases which would suit the European audience.

Track listing

Versions
 A limited edition containing instrumental versions of all 12 tracks was available for pre-order through the Midi:Nette online store until August 20, 2007. It was being manufactured on an order only basis, though was also available during the European 2007 tour. It includes a "Matin" game, (Mana's cartoon alter-ego), and various desktop tools.
 A strictly limited to 499 copies LP was made available in Europe.
 A 2CD version containing the single "Lamentful Miss" was also made available in Europe.

References

2007 albums
Moi dix Mois albums